Barenton-Bugny is a commune in the department of Aisne in the Hauts-de-France region of northern France.

Geography
Barenton-Bugny is located some 5 km north by northwest of Laon and 8 km south of Crecy-sur-Serre. The Autoroute des Anglais (A26 autoroute) passes through the commune, and there is an exit just south of the commune to National Highway N2 which passes north-east through the commune. From National Highway N2 the commune can be accessed on road D546 going north to the village then continuing northwest to intersect the D545 going north to Barenton-Cel. The D513 also goes east from the village to Monceau-le-Waast. There is also the D967 road which passes north-south through the western edge of the commune. Apart from the village and a few patches of forest the commune is entirely farmland with no other villages or hamlets.

The northwestern border of the commune is delineated by the Ruisseau de Longedeau which flows into the Ru des Barentons and continues north changing its name a few times before joining the Souche river.

Neighbouring communes and villages

Administration

List of Successive Mayors of Barenton-Bugny

Population

Sites and Monuments

The Church of Saint Martin (12th century) is registered as an historical monument.

Picture Gallery

Notable People linked to the commune
René Blondelle, Senator for Aisne and one of the largest postwar farmers in Barenton-Bugny.

See also
Communes of the Aisne department

References

External links
Barenton-Bugny on the old IGN website 
Bell Towers website 
40000 Bell Towers website 
Barenton-Bugny on Géoportail, National Geographic Institute (IGN) website 
Baranton Bugny on the 1750 Cassini Map

Communes of Aisne